Petty-Fitzmaurice is a double-barrelled surname of Irish origin.

People with the name Petty-Fitzmaurice include:

 Charles Petty-Fitzmaurice, 7th Marquess of Lansdowne (1917–1944), peer of Great Britain
 Charles Petty-Fitzmaurice, 9th Marquess of Lansdowne (born 1941), British peer
 Lord Charles Petty-FitzMaurice (1874–1914), British soldier and courtier
 Emily Petty-Fitzmaurice, Marchioness of Lansdowne (1819–1895), British peer
 George Petty-Fitzmaurice, 8th Marquess of Lansdowne (1912–1997), British peer
 Georgina Elizabeth Petty-Fitzmaurice (born 1950), Scottish nobility
 Henry Petty-Fitzmaurice, 3rd Marquess of Lansdowne (1780–1863), Irish peer
 Henry Petty-Fitzmaurice, 4th Marquess of Lansdowne (1816–1866), British politician
 Henry Petty-Fitzmaurice, 5th Marquess of Lansdowne (1845–1927), British politician and Irish peer 
 Henry Petty-Fitzmaurice, 6th Marquess of Lansdowne (1872–1936), Earl of Kerry
 Maud Petty-FitzMaurice, Marchioness of Lansdowne (1850–1932), British courtier
John Petty Fitzmaurice, 1st Earl of Shelburne. PC(Ire) (1706–1761)
 William Petty FitzMaurice,(1737–1805). 2nd Earl of Shelbourne, 1st Marquess of Lansdowne PC(Ire) KG. British Prime Minister (1782_1783).

See also
 Fitzmaurice
 Fitzmorris

Compound surnames
Surnames of Irish origin
Surnames of Norman origin
Surnames of English origin